In 2001, 1. deild was the top-tier league in Faroe Islands football (since 2005, the top tier has been the Faroe Islands Premier League, with 1. deild becoming the second tier).

Statistics of 1. deild in the 2001 season.

Overview
It was contested by 10 teams, and B36 Tórshavn won the championship.

League standings

Results
The schedule consisted of a total of 18 games. Each team played two games against every opponent in no particular order. One of the games was at home and one was away.

Top goalscorers
Source: faroesoccer.com

1. deild seasons
Faroe
Faroe
1